The Journal of the International Phonetic Association (JIPA) is a peer-reviewed academic journal that appears three times a year. It is published by Cambridge University Press on behalf of the International Phonetic Association. It was established as Dhi Fonètik Tîtcer ("The Phonetic Teacher") in 1886. In 1889, it was renamed Le Maître Phonétique and French was designated as the Association's official language. It was written entirely in the IPA, with its name being written accordingly as "" and hence abbreviated "mf", until it obtained its current name and English became the official language again in 1971. It covers topics in phonetics and applied phonetics such as speech therapy and voice recognition. The journal is abstracted and indexed in the MLA Bibliography.

Editors 
(as dhi fonètik tîtcer)
1886–1887 Paul Passy
(as ðə fɔnetik tîtcər)
1887–1888 Paul Passy
(as lə mɛːtrə fɔnetik)
1889-1914 Paul Passy
1923– Paul Passy and Daniel Jones
 –1949 Daniel Jones
(as Le Maître Phonétique)
1950–1968 A. C. Gimson
1969–1970 A. C. Gimson and John C. Wells
(as JIPA)
1971–1974 A. C. Gimson and John C. Wells
1975-1985 John C. Wells
1986–1989 Anthony Bladon
1990 (ad hoc board)
1990–1995 Ian Maddieson
1996–1999 Martin Barry
2000–2002? Peter Ladefoged
2003?– John Esling (and co-editors?)
 –2011 John Esling and Adrian P. Simpson
2012–2014 Adrian P. Simpson
2014–2015 Adrian P. Simpson and Amalia Arvaniti
2016–2019 Amalia Arvaniti
2019–present Marija Tabain

References

Further reading

External links 
 
 Le Maître Phonétique on JSTOR
 Analytical Index to the Publications of the International Phonetic Association 1886–2006
 Illustrations of the International Phonetic Association (IPA) – interactive map

Publications established in 1971
Phonetics journals
Phonology journals
Audiology journals
Cambridge University Press academic journals
English-language journals
Triannual journals
Academic journals associated with learned and professional societies